Perry Watson (born April 30, 1950) is an American college basketball coach from Detroit, Michigan. He played for Eastern Michigan University (where he was a teammate of George Gervin), graduating in 1972.

In 1977, Watson took the head coaching position at Detroit Southwestern High School where he coached, among others, future NBA players Jalen Rose, Voshon Lenard and Howard Eisley. Watson left Southwestern to take a position on Steve Fisher's staff at the University of Michigan in 1991, coinciding with the arrival of the Fab Five of which Rose was a member.

After two years as an assistant under Fisher, Watson was hired as the head coach at the University of Detroit Mercy, where he spent the next 15 seasons. He compiled a record of 258-185, second in school history behind only Bob Calihan. He led the Titans to three Horizon League titles, along with their first NCAA Tournament wins since advancing all the way to the Sweet 16 in 1977.

Watson took an indefinite medical leave of absence in January 2008.  He resigned on March 5, 2008.  Perry Watson was an important character witness in the University of Michigan basketball scandal.

References

1950 births
Living people
American men's basketball coaches
American men's basketball players
Basketball coaches from Michigan
Basketball players from Detroit
Detroit Mercy Titans men's basketball coaches
Eastern Michigan Eagles men's basketball coaches
Eastern Michigan Eagles men's basketball players
High school basketball coaches in the United States
Junior college men's basketball players in the United States
Michigan Wolverines men's basketball coaches
Southwestern High School (Michigan) alumni